A Distant Shore is the first studio album by Tracey Thorn, released via Cherry Red Records in 1982. It includes a cover version of The Velvet Underground's "Femme Fatale".

Recorded for just £138, the album reached number 1 in the UK Indie Chart in 1983. In 2010, it was awarded a gold certification from the Independent Music Companies Association, which indicated sales of at least 100,000 copies throughout Europe.

Reception

In a positive review for Sounds, Penny Kiley wrote "This record, musically understated as it is, provides a quiet and necessary counterpart to some of the choices of listening we’ve had. We’ve lived so long with melodrama that we’ve forgotten there are other ways of showing passion."

Track listing

Personnel
Credits adapted from liner notes.
 Tracey Thorn – vocals, acoustic guitar, electric guitar
 Pat Bermingham – recording
 Jane Fox – cover drawing

Certifications

References

External links
 

1982 debut albums
Tracey Thorn albums
Cherry Red Records albums